The Raymond Fault is a  fault across central Los Angeles County and western Ventura County in Southern California.

San Gabriel Valley area
The eastern end of the Raymond Fault branches from the San Andreas Fault in the San Gabriel Mountains where it forms the east fork of the San Gabriel River and Monrovia Canyon. The fault is very straight and follows a WbS path. It then goes straight west through Arcadia and the Santa Anita Racetrack in the San Gabriel Valley, and then forms the San Rafael Hills in San Marino and South Pasadena, and Raymond Hill, after which the fault is named.

Los Angeles–Ventura areas
The fault continues west to form the hills of Highland Park, the lower eastern Santa Monica Mountains from Dodger Stadium, Silver Lake, and Griffith Park through the Hollywood Hills above the Sunset Strip and Studio City. Further west the Raymond Fault creates the higher central and western Santa Monica Mountains from Beverly Hills and along the southern San Fernando Valley to Thousand Oaks and Malibu, and on to Point Mugu at the Pacific Ocean. The fault then continues underwater to form the northern Channel Islands, and beyond to where it terminates.

External links
 Southern California Earthquake Data Center: Raymond Fault
 USGS Earthquake Hazards Program database: Raymond Fault

Seismic faults of California
Geology of Los Angeles County, California
Geology of Ventura County, California
Natural history of the Santa Monica Mountains
Natural history of the Transverse Ranges
Natural history of Los Angeles County, California
Natural history of Ventura County, California
Channel Islands of California
Geography of the San Fernando Valley
Geography of the San Gabriel Valley